Formed in 2005, Techno Squirrels is a band made up of Ryan Harlin (born Philadelphia, Pennsylvania, USA) and Lisa Eriksson (born Lund, Sweden).  Both Eriksson and Harlin are sound engineers and producers for Techno Squirrels.  Their music has been used in MTV's The Real World (Sydney), The Real World (Hollywood), The Real World vs. Road Rules Challenge, Regenesis (Sci Fi Channel), and on LucasArts' Thrillville 2 soundtrack.

Their debut album, Plastic Makes it Possible, was released in August 2007 with two singles (Love Comes First, and Unbelievable).  In September 2007, Love Comes First began getting regular rotation on Sirius Satellite Radio and by October of that year it had reached the number one spot on Channel 35's Top 40.  Shortly after Sirius, KCRW's Nic Harcourt picked up another cut off the album, "South of Colorado," to play on his nationally syndicated shows "Sounds Eclectic" and "Morning Becomes Eclectic."

On February 19, 2008 Om Records released their Chill Compilation, volume 2, featuring Techno Squirrels' "Love Comes First" track as track 1 on the CD. A remix of the track "Love Comes First (StyrofoamKid Remix) was recently included on the Cream Ibiza Paul Van Dyk Compilation of 2008.

Style

Techno Squirrels' music forms a blending of styles spanning various types of pop and electronic music.  Classified as pop, electronica, trance, house, progressive-house, or techno by different music reviewers and critics most people identify Techno Squirrels' sound by its cohesive similarity to itself more than its comparison to other artists.

Techno Squirrels' style walks a line between club-destined floor-thumping techno and more sensitive pop productions.  Not often ones to settle for a single vocal sample to carry an electronic track, Techno Squirrels are more known for their pop structures (verses, choruses, bridges, etc.) laid over danceable foundations of "4-on-the-floor" beats and bass lines.

They do also, however, depart more dramatically from dance music into electronica tracks closer in nature to artists like the Postal Service, Telepopmusik, or Frou Frou.

Background

Eriksson, no stranger to electronic and experimental music founded the underground band Schulte/Eriksson (Org Records), whose discordant and poly-rhythmic pop songs caught the ears of legendary BBC DJ John Peel in the late 90s.  Around the same time, Eriksson joined with Daniel Hunt and Reuben Wu to sing for their recently formed electropop group, Ladytron.  Eriksson recorded their breakthrough single with them, "He Took Her to a Movie", which ended up on their full length LP after Eriksson's departure from the group (as listed on the 2004 reissue of "604" by Rykodisc).

Ryan Harlin was a filmmaker and recording engineer prior to his involvement with Techno Squirrels.  His film work, still actively in production, documents the musical careers of early and influential punk rock bands like the Bouncing Souls, Youth Brigade, and NOFX.  Harlin also ran NovaSound, a recording studio in Philadelphia, USA from 1996 to 2000.

Techno Squirrels formed in 2005 in Los Angeles, California.  However the two first worked together during a Schulte/Eriksson recording session at the Liverpool Institute for Performing Arts (LIPA) - a higher education institution in Liverpool, England whose graduates from that time in the late 90s include, in addition to Harlin and Eriksson, fellow electronic artist Kate Havnevik, record producer Sean McGhee, and Sandi Thom.

Ryan Harlin has admitted in several interviews to his early resistance to electronic music and credits record producer and friend Sean McGhee with changing his opinion of the genre.  For Lisa Eriksson, it was a trip to the European music festival, Roskilde, which would first expose her to the sounds of early influential artists like Fluke and Underworld.

Around the same time, but separate from each other, Harlin and Eriksson were both beginning to experiment with electronic music production.  While Lisa Eriksson was beginning to add vintage analog synthesizers and samplers into her work with Schulte/Eriksson, Ryan Harlin was beginning to incorporate electronic elements into his music production and engineering work, even producing two early tracks with Kate Havnevik along with LIPA classmate Duncan Speakman.

In 2005, Ryan Harlin and Lisa Eriksson began collaborating musically - passing song ideas back and forth while Eriksson was attaining a master's degree in audio production from the University of Westminster, London, England.  Later the two both ended up in Los Angeles, California, Harlin producing films with Emo Riot Productions and Eriksson working in radio production.  By the middle of 2005 the two began production on what would become their debut single, "Mute", released by Rave Police Records in fall 2005.

In 2006, their remix of "Om Mani" showed up in repeated rotation on BBC1's Asian Network program.  In April 2007 "Om Mani" was also featured in an episode of Regenesis, a Canadian Sci-Fi television drama (season 3 episode 6).

Remixers

Techno Squirrels has been remixed by the following DJs and Producers:

Arthur Loves Plastic, Carmen Rizzo, Sean McGhee, DJ Denise, Nebulae, James Bernard, Johan Afterglow, The Puff, Glycerin, DJ Etain, RED-eye, Rene Patrique, Emotiquon, Robert Jax

Members

Ryan Harlin: (programming, songwriting, production, vocals) 2005–present
Lisa Eriksson: (programming, songwriting, production, vocals) 2005–present

Releases
 Mute (2005; Rave Police Records)
 Om Mani (2006; Rave Police Records)
 Love Comes First (2007; Rave Police Records)
 Unbelievable (2007; Rave Police Records)
 Plastic Makes it Possible (2007; Rave Police Records)
 Om Chill Compilation (Volume 2) (2008 Om Records, USA)
 Cream Ibiza Paul Van Dyk Compilation (2008 Vandit Records, Germany)
 Tech Dance Euphoria (2008, Ministry Of Sound, USA)
 Ludicity (LucasArts 2009, USA)

External links
Official Website

Electronic music groups from California